Basengele Airport  is an airstrip serving the village of Bokote in Mai-Ndombe Province, Democratic Republic of the Congo.

See also

 List of airports in the Democratic Republic of the Congo

References

 Basengele

External links
 OurAirports - Basengele

Airports in Mai-Ndombe Province